The Pakistan Federal Union of Journalists (PFUJ) is a trade union federation of journalists in Pakistan. PFUJ is affiliated with the International Federation of Journalists.

History
The constitution of the PFUJ was first adopted in Karachi in April 1950 at the Pakistan Working Journalists Convention, in a meeting opened by Muhammad Zafarullah Khan. The last affiliate union adopted the constitution on August 2, thus marking the formal beginning of the union. Muhammad Abdul Shakoor became the first president and Israr Ahmad (journalist) its first secretary general.

In Feb 2014, a merger of PFUJ and All Pakistan Newspaper Employees Confederation (APNEC) was announced to consolidate and strengthen the two journalism organisations.

PFUJ first launched a website in 2015.

When Express Tribune journalist Bilal Farooqi was arrested for alleged hateful and anti-military social media posts in September 2020, PFUJ condemned the arrest together with the International Federation of Journalists.

See also
 Council of Pakistan Newspaper Editors
 National Press Club of Pakistan based in Islamabad
 Karachi Press Club
 Lahore Press Club
 Minhaj Barna, founder of PFUJ and former President of All Pakistan Newspaper Employees Confederation (APNEC)
 Peshawar Press Club
 Quetta Press Club
 All Pakistan Newspapers Society (APNS)

References

Trade unions in Pakistan
1950 establishments in Pakistan
Pakistani journalism organisations
Journalists' trade unions
International Federation of Journalists